The 2016 Notre Dame Fighting Irish football team represented the University of Notre Dame in the 2016 NCAA Division I FBS football season. The team was coached by Brian Kelly and played its home games at Notre Dame Stadium in South Bend, Indiana. They competed as an independent. They finished the season 4–8, Notre Dame's worst record since 2007. Despite the disappointing season, athletic director Jack Swarbrick found the 2016 Irish to be a remarkable bunch, citing the team's "enthusiasm" and "willingness to practice".

Before the season

Previous season
The 2015 Notre Dame Fighting Irish football team finished the regular season with a 10–2 record. They lost to the Ohio State Buckeyes 44–28 in the Fiesta Bowl.

2016 NFL draft
The following former Notre Dame players were selected in the 2016 NFL Draft:

Transfers out / departures
Notre Dame lost FS Max Redfield and CB Devin Butler in the offseason for violating team policies.

Coaching changes
Brian VanGorder was relieved of his duties as defensive coordinator. Defensive Analyst Greg Hudson took over as the Irish's Defensive Coordinator. Kelly said, "I have the utmost respect for Brian as both a person and football coach, but our defense simply isn't where it should be and I believe this change is necessary for the best interest of our program and our student-athletes.

Recruiting class
Brian Kelly and the Notre Dame coaching staff accepted 23 commitments for the 2016 recruiting cycle, including two 5-stars: Daelin Hayes and Tommy Kraemer. The class included student-athletes from 11 different states, and one Canadian province.

Personnel

Coaching staff

Roster

Schedule

Game summaries

Texas

Nevada

Michigan State

Duke

Syracuse

NC State

The Notre Dame vs NC State game was played during Hurricane Matthew where the two teams combined for only 311 total yards. The only touchdown of the game was scored by NC State on a blocked punt leading NC State to win it 10–3.

Stanford

Miami (FL)

Navy

Army

Virginia Tech

USC

Rankings

References

Notre Dame
Notre Dame Fighting Irish football seasons
Notre Dame Fighting Irish football